Sandra Lynn Brown, née Cox (born March 12, 1948) is an American bestselling author of romantic novels and thriller suspense novels. Brown has also published works under the pen names of Rachel Ryan, Laura Jordan, and Erin St. Claire.

Early life and education
Sandra Brown was born in Waco, Texas, and raised in Fort Worth. She majored in English at Texas Christian University (TCU) in Fort Worth, but left college in 1968 to marry her husband, Michael Brown, a former television news anchor and award-winning documentarian, for Dust to Dust. They have one son, Ryan.

Career
After her marriage, Brown worked for KLTV in Tyler as a weathercaster, then returned to the Dallas-Fort Worth metroplex area where she became a reporter for WFAA-TV's version of PM Magazine.

Brown started her writing career in 1981 after her husband dared her to. Since then, she has published nearly 70 novels and had more than 50 New York Times bestsellers. In 2008, she was presented with an honorary doctorate of humane letters from her alma mater, TCU.

Her novel French Silk was made into a movie, released in 1994, for television. Susan Lucci, Shari Belafonte, and Lee Horsley starred. In 2016, her novel White Hot was turned into a Hallmark Movies & Mysteries Original movie titled, Sandra Brown's White Hot.

In 2007, she contributed to Court TV's series Murder By The Book, about the murder of Betty Gore in Wylie, Texas, on June 13, 1980.

Her book Seeing Red was published on August 17, 2017.

In August 2018, her new book Tailspin published by Grand Central landed at #7 on The New York Times bestsellers list.

Bibliography

As Rachel Ryan

Originally Dell Candlelight Ecstasy Romances – Single Novels

1981 Love's Encore
1981 Love Beyond Reason
1982 Eloquent Silence
1982 A Treasure Worth Seeking
1983 Prime Time

As Laura Jordan

Single novels
1982 Hidden Fires (Historical Romance)
1982 The Silken Web

As Erin St. Claire

Originally published as Harlequin/Silhouette Category Romances – Single Novels

1982 Not Even for Love
1983 Seduction by Design
1983 A Kiss Remembered
1983 A Secret Splendor
1984 Words of Silk
1984 Bittersweet Rain
1984 Tiger Prince
1985 Sweet Anger
1986 Above and Beyond
1986 Honor Bound
1987 Two Alone
1989 The Thrill of Victory

Astray & Devil Series
1985 Led Astray
1987 The Devil's Own

As Sandra Brown

Bantam Doubleday Dell's Loveswept Category Romance Books

1983 Tomorrow's Promise
1983 Relentless Desire
1983 Heaven's Price
1983 Temptations Kiss
1983 Tempest in Eden
1984 In a Class by Itself
1985 Thursday's Child
1985 Riley in the Morning
1986 The Rana Look
1986 22 Indigo Place
1987 Sunny Chandler's Return
1987 Demon Rumm
1988 Tidings of Great Joy
1988 Hawk O'Toole's Hostage
1989 Long Time Coming
1989 Temperatures Rising
1989 A Whole New Light

Bed & Breakfast Series
1983 Breakfast in Bed (Originally Loveswept # 22)
1984 Send No Flowers  (Originally Loveswept # 51)

Coleman Family Saga Series
(Historical Romance)
1985 Sunset Embrace
1985 Another Dawn

Mason Sisters Series
1987 Fanta C     (Originally Loveswept # 217)
1988 Adam's Fall (Originally Loveswept # 252)

Texas! Tyler Family Saga Series
1990 Texas! Lucky
1991 Texas! Chase
1991 Texas! Sage

Single Title Romance Suspense/Thrillers

1988 Slow Heat in Heaven
1989 Best Kept Secrets
1990 Mirror Image
1991 Breath of Scandal
1992 French Silk
1992 Shadows of Yesterday
1993 Where There's Smoke
1994 Charade
1994 Love beyond reason
1995 The Witness
1996 Exclusive
1997 Fat Tuesday
1998 Unspeakable
1999 The Alibi
2000 Standoff
2000 The Switch
2001 Envy
2002 The Crush
2003 Hello, Darkness
2004 White Hot
2005 Chill Factor
2006 Ricochet
2007 Play Dirty
2008 Smoke Screen
2009 Smash Cut
2009 Rainwater
2010 Tough Customer
2011 Lethal
2012 Love Is Murder
2012 Low Pressure
2013 Deadline
2014 Mean Streak
2015 Friction
2016 Sting
2017 MatchUp
2017 Seeing Red
2018 Tailspin
2019 Outfox
2020 Thick As Thieves
2021 Blind Tiger

Omnibus
Three Complete Novels: Mirror Image / Best Kept Secret / Slow Heat In Heaven (1992)
Three Complete Novels: Texas Lucky! / Texas Chase! / Texas Sage!
Crush / Hello Darkness (2006)
Heaven's Price / Breakfast in Bed / Send No Flowers (2007)
Tomorrow's Promise / Two Alone  (2008)
Led Astray / Devil's Own (2010)
A Secret Splendor / Above and Beyond (2011)

Awards
 American Business Women's Association's Distinguished Circle of Success
 A.C. Greene Award
 Romance Writers of America's Lifetime Achievement Award
 International Thriller Writers Award, "Thrillermaster", 2008

Notes

References
Sandra Brown's official homepage
Sandra Brown at eHarlequin

External links

Q&A With Sandra Brown AllYourTV.com
Erin St. Claire and Sandra Brown at Fantastic Fiction
Sandra Brown, Rachel Ryan, Erin St. Claire and Laura Jordan at the  Internet Book List
 http://sandrabrown.net/books_search.php
 http://www.fantasticfiction.co.uk/b/sandra-brown/
 Sandra Brown's Official Wattpad Profile

20th-century American novelists
21st-century American novelists
American romantic fiction writers
American thriller writers
Living people
Novelists from Texas
Texas Christian University alumni
People from Waco, Texas
1948 births
Women romantic fiction writers
American women novelists
Women mystery writers
Women thriller writers
20th-century American women writers
21st-century American women writers